María del Carmen Salvatori Bronca (born 19 August 1957) is a Mexican politician from the Citizens' Movement. From 2006 to 2009 she served as Deputy of the LX Legislature of the Mexican Congress representing Veracruz.

References

1957 births
Living people
Politicians from Puebla
Women members of the Chamber of Deputies (Mexico)
Citizens' Movement (Mexico) politicians
21st-century Mexican politicians
21st-century Mexican women politicians
Deputies of the LX Legislature of Mexico
Members of the Chamber of Deputies (Mexico) for Veracruz